David C. Landers (September 11, 1801 – June 5, 1890) was a political figure in Nova Scotia, Canada. He represented Annapolis County in the Nova Scotia House of Assembly from 1867 to 1874 as a Liberal member.

He was born in Yarmouth, Nova Scotia, the son of Isaac Landers and Mehitable Corning. In 1832, he married Mary Upham Slocumb. He was a justice of the peace. Landers lived in Nictaux, Nova Scotia. He died in 1890.

References 

 A Directory of the Members of the Legislative Assembly of Nova Scotia, 1758-1958, Public Archives of Nova Scotia (1958)

1801 births
1890 deaths
Nova Scotia Liberal Party MLAs
People from Yarmouth, Nova Scotia
Canadian justices of the peace